Pachycerina is a genus of flies belonging to the family Lauxaniidae.

The species of this genus are found in Southern Africa.

Selected species
 Pachycerina alpicola (Czerny, 1932) 
 Pachycerina alutacea Shatalkin, 1999

References

Lauxaniidae
Brachycera genera